Historic Hudson Valley is a not-for-profit educational and historic preservation organization headquartered in Tarrytown, New York. The organization runs tours and events at five historic properties in Westchester County, in the lower Hudson River Valley.

Sites 
The organization operates at five historic sites in Westchester County open for public tours:
 Kykuit, the Rockefeller estate in Pocantico Hills (owned by the National Trust for Historic Preservation)
 Philipsburg Manor House in Sleepy Hollow
 Washington Irving's Sunnyside in Tarrytown
 Union Church of Pocantico Hills in Pocantico Hills
 Van Cortlandt Manor in Croton-on-Hudson

History 
Historic Hudson Valley was formally founded in 1951 as Sleepy Hollow Restorations by John D. Rockefeller Jr., when the state of New York chartered the organization as a non-profit educational institution. Historic Hudson Valley continues to operate under the same charter. 

John D. Rockefeller Jr., who was deeply interested in preserving places of historic importance, had provided the funding for the establishment of Colonial Williamsburg, among other projects. He created Sleepy Hollow Restorations to preserve Sunnyside, the home of the celebrated writer Washington Irving; Philipsburg Manor; and Van Cortlandt Manor. He saw in all three the potential to educate the public about the history and culture of the Hudson River Valley and wished to assure their preservation and public access.

In 1945, Rockefeller purchased Sunnyside from Washington Irving's collateral descendants and underwrote its restoration. In 1950, Rockefeller arranged for the transfer of the title to Philipsburg Manor, which had been operated by the Historic Society of the Tarrytowns, to Sleepy Hollow Restorations, and in 1953, he acquired Van Cortlandt Manor and brought a team of historians and architects from Colonial Williamsburg to restore and refurnish it.

In 1984, Sleepy Hollow Restorations acquired title to the Union Church of Pocantico Hills (which contains stained glass windows by Henri Matisse and Marc Chagall given by members of the Rockefeller family), and In 1986, acquired Montgomery Place in Dutchess County. The purchase of Montgomery Place was part of a strategy to expand the organization's influence in the Hudson River Valley beyond Westchester County, a change in strategy accompanied by a change in name the following year to Historic Hudson Valley. (Historic Hudson Valley sold Montgomery Place to Bard College in January 2016.)

Kykuit, the Rockefeller estate in Pocantico Hills, had been left to the National Trust for Historic Preservation in the will of Governor Nelson A. Rockefeller, who died in 1979. The Rockefeller Brothers Fund leased the property from the National Trust, and in 1991, entered into a partnership with Historic Hudson Valley to operate a program of public tours, which started in 1994.

In 1992, Historic Hudson Valley's IRS status changed from that of a private foundation to a public, not-for-profit organization.

Governing board 
The organization is governed by a volunteer board of trustees and funds its operation through visitor admission and membership fees, annual fundraising, and an annual draw from its largely unrestricted endowment. Waddell W. Stillman is the president.

Educational mission 
Historic Hudson Valley focuses its work on three key areas:

Guided tours
Tours at Philipsburg Manor, Sunnyside, and Van Cortlandt Manor use the third-person "living history" approach by interpreters in historic clothing supplemented by hands-on demonstrations of period work and leisure activities, while Kykuit and the Union Church use a more traditional lecture/discussion approach. Philipsburg Manor concentrates on telling the story of slavery in the colonial north. Sunnyside focuses on Washington Irving and the Romantic movement in 19th-century literature, landscape, and architecture. At Van Cortlandt Manor, the themed-tours concentrate on interpreting lifestyles and history of the New Nation Period that immediately followed the American Revolution.

School Programs
Historic Hudson Valley offers a varied menu of school workshops developed with teachers and based on state curriculum requirements.

Special events
Special events focus on issues and ideas that are season-specific or that require a fuller programmatic rendering than is possible on the standard tour. For example: 
CORNucopia, held at the end of summer in Sleepy Hollow, NY, is an annual "festival at Philipsburg Manor celebrating the importance of corn and its heritage in America".
Dickens's 'Christmas Carol', held annually at the Old Dutch Church of Sleepy Hollow at Christmastime, is a performance wherein a "master storyteller, Jonathan Kruk, complete with musical accompaniment, regales you with his adaptation of Charles Dickens’s “A Christmas Carol.”
Pinkster is an annual re-creation of the 18th-century African-Colonial festival of Pentecost, through which visitors can explore African music, dance, foodways, and storytelling. 
Sheep-to-Shawl, held every April at Philipsburg Manor in Sleepy Hollow, NY, celebrates, "From fiber to fashion, [...] all things wooly sheep! Visitors are invited to explore each step in the process of turning wool into cloth using 18th-century techniques." Additionally, "Hands-on activities include dyeing wool and crafts for children, including a giant 20-foot diameter weaving project!", and "Outside on the grounds, Scottish border collies display their skills at sheep- and duck-herding. Visitors are invited to enjoy a fashion show, Project Colonial Runway, and kick up their heels to the sounds of a live bluegrass band."
The Great Jack O’Lantern Blaze and Horseman's Hollow explore traditions linked to "The Legend of Sleepy Hollow" and contemporary ways of observing the traditions of Halloween. Additionally, Irving's Legend, held annually at the Old Dutch Church of Sleepy Hollow every autumn, is a performance wherein "Master storytellers Jonathan Kruk and Jim Keyes offer dramatic performances of Washington Irving’s classic tale, featuring the Headless Horseman, Ichabod Crane, Brom Bones, and Katrina Van Tassel. Flavored with live spooky music, the spellbinding storytelling captivates all audiences."

See also
 National Trust for Historic Preservation

References

External links 
 Historic Hudson Valley at hudsonvalley.org

Tarrytown, New York
Organizations established in 1951